Tate Township may refer to the following townships in the United States:

 Tate Township, Saline County, Illinois
 Tate Township, Clermont County, Ohio